Malea is a genus of large sea snails, marine gastropod mollusks in the family Tonnidae, the tun shells.

Species
Species within the genus Malea include:
 † Malea densecostata (Rutsch, 1934) 
 † Malea hyaducki Petuch & Berschauer, 2021 
 † Malea orbiculata (Brocchi, 1814) 
 † Malea papuana (Beets, 1943) 
 † Malea petiti Petuch, 1989 
 Malea pomum (Linnaeus, 1758)
 Malea ringens (Swainson, 1822)
 † Malea springi Petuch, 1989 
Species brought into synonymy 
 Malea crassilabris Valenciennes, 1832: synonym of  Malea ringens (Swainson, 1822)
 Malea crassilabrumValenciennes, 1832  synonym of Malea ringens (Swainson, 1822)
 Malea dentatum (Barnes, 1824): synonym of Malea ringens (Swainson, 1822)
 Malea latilabris Valenciennes, 1832: synonym of Malea ringens (Swainson, 1822)
 Malea noronhensis Kempf & Matthews, 1969: synonym of Malea pomum (Linnaeus, 1758)
 Malea pommum (Linnaeus, 1758): synonym of Malea pomum (Linnaeus, 1758)

Distribution
This marine genus of cone snails occurs in the Red Sea, the tropical Indo-West Pacific; off the Philippines and Australia (the Northern Territory, Queensland and Western Australia).

References

 Iredale, T. 1929. Strange molluscs in Sydney Harbour. The Australian Zoologist 5(4): 337–352, pls 37-38
 Wilson, B. 1993. Australian Marine Shells. Prosobranch Gastropods. Kallaroo, Western Australia : Odyssey Publishing Vol. 1 408 pp.
 Beu, A. G. (2005) Neogene fossil tonnoidean gastropods of Indonesia. Scripta Geologica 130, p. 1-186, pp. 166, figs. 327
 Vos, C. (2007). A conchological Iconography (No. 13) - The family Tonnidae. 123 pp., 30 numb. plus 41 (1 col.) un-numb. text-figs, 33 maps., 63 col. pls, Conchbooks, Germany page(s): 26
 Vos, C. (2012) Overview of the Tonnidae (MOLLUSCA: GASTROPODA) in Chinese waters. Shell Discoveries 1(1); pp. 12–22; Pls. 1-9
 Vos, C. (2013) Overview of the Tonnidae (Mollusca: Gastropoda) in Chinese waters. Gloria Maris 52(1-2); pp. 22–53; Pls. 1-9

External links
 Valenciennes, A. 1832. Coquilles univalves marines de l'Amérique Équinoxiale, recueillies pendant le voyage de MM A. de Humboldt et A. Bonpland. 262-339, pl. 57 in Humboldt, F.H.A. & Bonpland, A.J.A. (eds). Voyage aux regions équinoxiales du Nouveau Continent. Part 2. Recueil d'observations de zoologie et d'atomie comparée. Coquilles univalves (etc.). Paris : Chez J. Smith et Chez Gide Vol. 2.

Tonnidae